Suzanne Cobb Germain (born Suzanne Cobb; July 22, 1963) is an American former soccer player who played as a defender, making one appearance for the United States women's national team.

Career
In high school, Cobb Germain played for the Langley Saxons, before playing for the North Carolina Tar Heels in college. She was named to the All-NCAA Tournament Team in 1983, the team's most valuable player in 1984, and was a first team All-American in 1983 and 1984. In total, she made 84 appearances for the Tar Heels, scoring twice and registering ten assists. In 2006, she was inducted into the Virginia–D.C. Soccer Hall of Fame.

Cobb Germain made her only international appearance for the United States on July 9, 1986 against Canada in a play-off for the 1986 North America Cup title (a friendly tournament). The match, which lasted 30 minutes, was won by the U.S 3–0 to win the tournament.

Personal life
Cobb Germain was born on July 22, 1963, to Barbara and Douglas Cobb. She married Gregory William Germain on March 11, 1989, in Fairfax County, Virginia. She is the sister-in-law of fellow U.S. international Ann Orrison, who had previously married Gregory's brother Everett in 1986. Cobb Germain, in her only international appearance, had previously played alongside Orrison against Canada.

Career statistics

International

Honors
United States
 1986 North America Cup

References

1963 births
Living people
Soccer players from Virginia
American women's soccer players
United States women's international soccer players
Women's association football defenders
North Carolina Tar Heels women's soccer players
People from McLean, Virginia
Sportspeople from Fairfax County, Virginia